Conder Bridge is a Grade II listed single segmental arch bridge spanning the River Conder in the English village of Conder Green, Thurnham, Lancashire. The structure dates to the early 19th century. The bridge carries the vehicular and pedestrian traffic of the A588.

The bridge is flanked by piers, with abutments also punctuated by piers. It has a solid parapet with a string course and weathered coping.

See also
Listed buildings in Thurnham, Lancashire

References

Grade II listed buildings in Lancashire
Bridges in Lancashire
Stone bridges in England
Road bridges in England
Bridges completed in the 19th century
19th-century establishments in England